Nicholas M. Rinaldi (April 2, 1934 – May 27, 2020) was an American poet and novelist.

Life
Rinaldi earned a doctorate from Fordham University. He was the author of four novels and three collections of poetry. His poems and fiction won numerous awards, and he was honored as the 2007 Artist of the Year by the Fairfield Arts Council.

He taught courses in literature and creative writing at Fairfield University in Fairfield, Connecticut. He lived in Bridgeport, Connecticut, with his wife Jackie, a literary critic. Rinaldi had four children. He died from complications of COVID-19 on May 27, 2020, aged 86, amid the COVID-19 pandemic in Connecticut.

Bibliography

Poetry collections
The Resurrection of the Snails (1977, J F Blair)
We Have Lost Our Fathers (1982, University Press of Florida)
The Luftwaffe in Chaos (1985 Negative Capability Press)

Novels
Bridge Fall Down (1985) — (St Martin's Press)
The Jukebox Queen of Malta (1999) — (Bantam)
Between Two Rivers (2004) — (HarperCollins)
The Remarkable Courtship of General Tom Thumb (2015) - (Scribner)

References

External links
Fairfield University Profile 
  www.nicholasrinaldi.net Author's website
NPR's Jon Kalish interview with Nicholas Rinaldi

1934 births
2020 deaths
American poets of Italian descent
20th-century American novelists
21st-century American novelists
American male novelists
Fordham University alumni
Fairfield University faculty
Writers from Bridgeport, Connecticut
Writers from Brooklyn
20th-century American poets
21st-century American poets
American male poets
20th-century American male writers
21st-century American male writers
Novelists from New York (state)
Novelists from Connecticut
Deaths from the COVID-19 pandemic in Connecticut